Shareshill is a civil parish in the district of South Staffordshire, Staffordshire, England. It contains four listed buildings that are recorded in the National Heritage List for England. Of these, one is at Grade II*, the middle of the three grades, and the others are at Grade II, the lowest grade. The parish includes the village of Shareshill and the surrounding area. The listed buildings consist of a church, a farm building, a farmhouse and a house, both with associated structures.


Key

Buildings

References

Citations

Sources

Lists of listed buildings in Staffordshire
South Staffordshire District